Cleveland Lakefront Station is an Amtrak train station at North Coast Harbor in Cleveland, Ohio. The current station was built in 1977 to provide service to the Lake Shore Limited route (New York/Boston-Chicago), which was reinstated by Amtrak via Cleveland and Toledo in 1975. It replaced service to Cleveland Union Terminal. Lakefront Station is located in downtown Cleveland near the Lake Erie waterfront, adjacent to the Cleveland Memorial Shoreway and in the immediate vicinity of the Rock and Roll Hall of Fame, the Great Lakes Science Center, the Steamship William G. Mather Museum and FirstEnergy Stadium. The station has had little to no renovation since its opening.

The station is a service stop on Amtrak's daily Lake Shore Limited and Capitol Limited trains, both of which pass through in the middle of the night. The station is also served by the RTA Waterfront Line. The Pennsylvanian served Cleveland from 1998 to 2003, when it reverted to its original Pittsburgh–New York route. As of 2021, proposals exist for the Pennsylvanian and several other routes to return to Cleveland.

History

Amtrak used to run its trains through Cleveland Union Terminal (now Tower City Center), which was built in 1928 and served as the main terminal for the Shaker Heights Rapid Transit, and in 1955, the crosstown Red Line. By 1971, because of Cleveland Union Terminal's high rent, the massive size of the facility, and the need to switch to electric locomotives to access its enclosed platforms, the newly-formed Amtrak rerouted passenger service to the ex-Big Four Railroad tracks on January 2, 1972. The "platform" extended from the former Erie Railroad depot to the intersection of Superior Avenue and Old River Road, underneath the Detroit–Superior Bridge. This stop was discontinued when the Lake Shore train ended service on January 5. Construction of a temporary station began in September 1975. This temporary station opened for Lake Shore Limited service on October 31, 1975. Groundbreaking of the current Lakefront Station was August 31, 1976, with the station officially opened on June 29, 1977. The formal dedication of the station occurred on July 12. According to Amtrak's employee magazine, a crowd of more than 300 gathered for the dedication of the $552,000 depot. Speakers included Mary J. Head, vice chairman of the Amtrak Board of Directors, and Cleveland Mayor Ralph J. Perk. Following the dedication ceremony, attendees were invited to tour the facility and enjoy cake and coffee.

Lakefront Station has undergone little to no renovation since its opening. In recent years, its lack of modernization has become more noticeable, especially its appearance and lack of adequate signage. In August 2012, when the Huntington Convention Center of Cleveland was under construction, a Cuyahoga County official expressed a desire to keep Lakefront Station out of view, and even Amtrak officials conceded that the station had not aged well. One proposed solution was to build a new station underground, but due to a lack of funding, the county settled on hiding the station behind trees and shrubs as a short-term solution.

Services

Cleveland has four daily trains: the Capitol Limited (trains 29 and 30) between Washington, D.C. and Chicago, and the Lake Shore Limited (trains 48/448 and 49/449) between Chicago and New York City/Boston. , these trains were scheduled to arrive/depart from Cleveland at various times between 1:00 a.m. and 5:50 a.m. The timing of the departures and arrivals has drawn criticism, with Amtrak also trying to tinker with train schedules through suggestions, reminding people that the schedules are not set in stone.

The Cleveland RTA Rapid Waterfront Line tracks separate the station building and Amtrak platform. There is no platform for the Waterfront Line trains, but they will stop at the station upon request, with passengers discharging at the at-grade pedestrian connection to the building. As such, the stop is not wheelchair accessible. Disabled passengers must instead board or disembark at the North Coast station, which is within walking distance to the Amtrak station. However, the Waterfront Line currently does not run during most of the time of day that includes Amtrak arrivals or departures.

The Lake Shore Limited has served Lakefront Station from its opening in 1975. The Capitol Limited began stopping at Lakefront on November 12, 1990, after Conrail's abandonment of portions of the ex-Pittsburgh, Fort Wayne and Chicago Railway in northwestern Indiana forced the re-routing of that train along with the Broadway Limited. Previously it had passed to the south, serving Canton. Between 1998 and 2003, the Pennsylvanian served Cleveland, providing daylight service to Chicago and Philadelphia. Weak ridership prompted Amtrak to return the train to a Pittsburgh–New York schedule.

On May 27, 2021, Amtrak released a long-range planning document detailing plans for multiple new corridor routes, including possible extensions of one round trip of the Pennsylvanian and Empire Service each to Cleveland. In addition, there are proposals for three round trips to Detroit via Toledo, and to Cincinnati via Columbus and Dayton. However, Lakefront Station would be unable to accommodate this dramatic increase in service. For this reason, a group by the name of All Aboard Ohio is pushing for the restoration of rail service at Cleveland Union Terminal.

Station layout

Amtrak trains stop on the southernmost track at a side platform; the RTA tracks do not have any true platforms, but RTA trains can stop on the walkway between the station building and Amtrak platform. The structure has a porte-cochère, which protects passengers from inclement weather. The interior was built with a similar design to that of the exterior, and features a central skylight. Shadows from its exposed trusses create different patterns on the brown brick floor, built in a basket-weaved pattern. Exposed ductwork is visible throughout the trusses, as are the light fixtures. All of the ceiling elements are painted white, which tend to recede and produce a sense of airiness which is further enhanced by the floor-to-ceiling windows. Banks of seats are located close to public telephones and a vending area.

See also
 Railroad terminals of Cleveland

References

External links

 Amtrak Rapid Station page
 Cleveland Lakefront Station (USA RailGuide -- TrainWeb)

Amtrak stations in Ohio
Waterfront Line (RTA Rapid Transit)
Transportation buildings and structures in Cleveland
Railway stations in the United States opened in 1975
Chicago Line (Norfolk Southern)
1975 establishments in Ohio